Glenaeon Rudolf Steiner School is an independent, comprehensive, co-educational, non-denominational, Steiner early learning, primary and secondary day school co-located across multiple campuses in Middle Cove, Castlecrag and Willoughby in the Lower North Shore of Sydney, New South Wales, Australia. It was the first Steiner school established in Australia. The three campuses include the Pre-School in Willoughby, a Junior School (K-2) at Castlecrag and years 3-12 in Middle Cove.

The school’s curriculum and pedagogy follows the NSW Education Standards Authority requirements, combined with the educational insights of Austrian-born philosopher, scientist, artist and educator Rudolf Steiner (1861-1925). There are now more than 1000 Steiner schools in 61 different countries worldwide and over 40 Steiner schools in Australia.

Kamaroi Rudolf Steiner School (K-6), is located in Belrose and serves as a feeder school for both Glenaeon and Lorien Novalis School in Dural.

Glenaeon's motto is “Inspiring Meaningful Lives”. It was previously  "Unfolding Individual Journeys” and "Education for Life".

History
The school was originally established in Pymble in 1957, by Sylvia Brose OAM, out of the community surrounding Walter and Marion Burley Griffin and their belief that the values of design, the arts, community, nature and spirit needed to underpin a rich academic education.

In 1970 the school was fully established in Middle Cove, located on four and a half acres of bushland. During the 1990s, Glenaeon expanded to the Castlecrag campus, where it now caters for Kindergarten and classes 1 and 2.

Facilities
The School currently has two halls, the Sylvia Brose Hall at Middle Cove and the Marion Mahony Griffin Hall at Castlecrag. The Middle Cove campus also includes two playing fields, two multipurpose basketball courts, specialist Design & Technology and Art facilities, a biodynamic garden and music rooms. The high school building features several classrooms including a recently renovated library.

Notable alumni 
Entertainment, media and the arts
 John Polson, actor and film director; founder of Tropfest
Toby Thatcher, oboist; Sydney Symphony Orchestra assistant conductor
 Richard Claremont, artist
 Hip Hop trio Bliss N Eso members Jonathan "Bliss" Notley and Max "Eso" MacKinnon

Politics, public service and the law
 James Gardener, tech executive; former Department for Work and Pensions CTO

See also 
 List of non-government schools in New South Wales

References

External links 
 School website
 Glenaeon Facebook Page 
 Glenaeon Alumni Facebook Page

Educational institutions established in 1957
Private primary schools in Sydney
Private secondary schools in Sydney
Waldorf schools in Australia
1957 establishments in Australia